Dacrydium gracile is a species of conifer in the family Podocarpaceae.
It is found only in Malaysian Borneo.

Range and habitat
Dacrydium gracile is endemic to Malaysian Borneo. It is found principally in the vicinity of Mount Kinabalu in Sabah, and is also known from one location in Sarawak.

It is native to lower montane rain forest, between 950 and 1,800 metres elevation. It is generally found in nutrient-poor soils, associated with the conifers Agathis borneensis, Podocarpus laubenfelsii, Sundacarpus amarus, Falcatifolium falciforme, Nageia wallichiana, and Dacrycarpus imbricatus. In Sarawak it occurs in low-canopy heath forest on infertile sandstone.

References

gracile
Vulnerable plants
Taxa named by David John de Laubenfels
Endemic flora of Borneo
Flora of Mount Kinabalu
Flora of Sabah
Flora of Sarawak
Flora of the Borneo montane rain forests
Plants described in 1988
Taxonomy articles created by Polbot